Boccaccio '70 is a 1962 comedy anthology film directed by Vittorio De Sica, Federico Fellini, Mario Monicelli and Luchino Visconti from an idea by Cesare Zavattini. It consists of four episodes, each by one of the directors, all about a different aspect of morality and love in modern times in the style of Giovanni Boccaccio.

Plot

Renzo e Luciana
Directed by Mario Monicelli. Written by Giovanni Arpino, Italo Calvino, Suso Cecchi d'Amico and Mario Monicelli. Music by Piero Umiliani. With Marisa Solinas and Germano Giglioli.

In Renzo e Luciana (Renzo and Luciana), a young couple tries to hide their marriage and the wife’s supposed pregnancy from the draconian rules at their place of employment, which has banned female employees from getting married and having children. Their efforts – both at their shared home (having temporarily moved into her family's crowded apartment), and at work (where they go so far as to pretend not to know each other) – causes pressure to mount on the couple. Their hope is to make it through until they have managed to save some money to move out, and are dependent on Renzo going to night school to become an accountant. Finally their life together has some privacy, but they are increasingly separated by their respective shifts: he returns home from work just when she has to leave to go there.

This first episode was only included in the Italian distribution of the film. Out of solidarity toward Monicelli, the other three directors did not go to the Cannes Film Festival for the presentation of the film.

Le Tentazioni del Dottor Antonio
Directed by Federico Fellini. Written by Fellini, Ennio Flaiano and Tullio Pinelli. Music by Nino Rota. With Peppino De Filippo and Anita Ekberg.

In Le Tentazioni del Dottor Antonio (The Temptation of Dr Antonio), Dr Antonio Mazzuolo, a middle-aged man, has taken it upon himself to be the protector of Rome's morality and law and order from what he sees as vice, crime and immorality throughout the city. The doctor (in his tiny Fiat equipped with a police spotlight) wages his one-man crusade – shining the spotlight at lovers in parked cars, or bounding on stage of a cabaret, ordering the stage crew (which includes a smiling police officer) to shut the lights, as he closes the curtain behind a line of bewildered chorus girls. He admonishes the audience to 'go home, and spend (their) money' in a 'better way instead of seeing this filth.' His anger knows no bounds when a provocative billboard of Anita Ekberg with the tag line "drink more milk" is put up in a park near his residence. Little does he know how the billboard will impact his life. Throughout the film, children are heard singing the jingle "Bevete più latte, bevete più latte!" ("Drink more milk!"). The image begins to haunt him with hallucinations in which Ekberg appears as a temptress. After his delirium culminates in throwing a spear at Ekberg's image, he is found collapsed on top of the billboard and transported away in an ambulance to the children's song.

Il Lavoro
Directed by Luchino Visconti. Written by Suso Cecchi d'Amico and Visconti. Music by Nino Rota. With Romy Schneider, Tomas Milian, and Romolo Valli.

Il Lavoro (The Job), is about an aristocratic couple. The husband is caught by the press visiting prostitutes. After saying she intends from then on to work for her income, the wife demands payment from her husband for her sexual services, to which he agrees.

La Riffa
Directed by Vittorio De Sica. Written by Cesare Zavattini. Music by Armando Trovajoli. With Sophia Loren.

In La Riffa (The Raffle), a timid lottery winner is entitled to one night with the attractive Zoe (Sophia Loren). Zoe, however, has other plans.

Cast
 Marisa Solinas as Luciana
 Germano Giglioli as Renzo
 Peppino De Filippo as Dr. Antonio Mazzuolo
 Anita Ekberg as herself
 Romy Schneider as Pupe
 Tomas Milian as Ottavio
 Romolo Valli as Zacchi
 Sophia Loren as Zoe

Artistic legacy
An orchestrated version of the song "Bevete più latte", from Le Tentazioni del Dottor Antonio, was one of 13 tracks, recorded by Italian band Piccola Orchestra Avion Travel and arranged by Fabrizio France, for their 2009 album "Nino Rota, L'Amico Magico," released to mark the 30th anniversary of the 1979 death of composer Nino Rota.

"Bevete più latte" was also used in the song "Milk Sheik" by singer Lizzy Mercier Descloux on her album Mambo Nassau from 1981.

References

External links
 
 

1962 films
1962 comedy films
1960s Italian-language films
Commedia all'italiana
Films directed by Federico Fellini
Films directed by Luchino Visconti
Films directed by Mario Monicelli
Films directed by Vittorio De Sica
Films produced by Carlo Ponti
Films scored by Armando Trovajoli
Films scored by Nino Rota
Films scored by Piero Umiliani
Films set in Milan
Films set in Rome
Films with screenplays by Cesare Zavattini
Films with screenplays by Federico Fellini
French anthology films
Giovanni Boccaccio
Italian anthology films
1960s Italian films